Colton High School is a public high school in Colton, Oregon, United States.

Colton High School is a small, rural high school tucked into the foothills of the Cascades in Western Oregon. They currently employ 13 teachers who are serving approximately 200 students.  In 2010 the school was selected as a Model School by the International Center for Leadership in Education after a 5 year collaboration, data collection, and on-site direction from the Successful Practices Network. CHS students generally perform at or above the state averages on testing typically maintaining around a 90% graduation rate.

References

High schools in Clackamas County, Oregon
Public high schools in Oregon